Mônica Morais Dias Riedel (born 28 September 1970) is the wife of Eduardo Riedel and currently serves as First Lady of Mato Grosso do Sul since January 1, 2023. Mônica gained more prominence in appearances alongside the husband's work and volunteering. 

In 1994, she married Eduardo Riedel; the two have two children, Marcela and Rafael. Mónica obtained a degree in business management from the Fundação Getulio Vargas in December 2020.

As first lady, Mónica will replace Fátima Azambuja, wife of Reinaldo Azambuja.

References

External links 

 

1970 births
Living people
People from Mato Grosso do Sul
First ladies of Brazil
Spouses of Brazilian politicians
Brazilian women activists
Fundação Getulio Vargas alumni